Daouda Compaoré (born January 6, 1973) is a Burkinabé football player who currently plays for ASFA Yennega as a goalkeeper.

Career 
Compaoré has played for K.V.C. Westerlo in the past.

International 
He was part of the Burkinabé 2004 African Nations Cup team, who finished bottom of their group in the first round of competition, thus failing to secure qualification for the quarter-finals.

Clubs 
2003-2004 K.V.C. Westerlo
2004–present ASFA Yennega

Privates 
Daouda's younger brother Djibril Compaoré played with him for ASFA Yennega and is former member of the Burkina Faso national football team.

References

External links

1973 births
Living people
Burkinabé footballers
Burkinabé expatriate footballers
Burkina Faso international footballers
Association football goalkeepers
ASFA Yennenga players
K.V.C. Westerlo players
Expatriate footballers in Belgium
2004 African Cup of Nations players
Sportspeople from Ouagadougou
21st-century Burkinabé people